This is a list of Brazilian television related events from 1978.

Events

Debuts

Television shows

1970s
Turma da Mônica (1976–present)
Sítio do Picapau Amarelo (1977–1986)

Births
13 January - Victor Pecoraro, actor & model
3 August - Anderson Di Rizzi, actor
6 October - Samara Felippo, actress
4 December - Katiuscia Canoro, actress

Deaths

See also
1978 in Brazil